Lutheran High School East, located in Cleveland Heights, Ohio, is affiliated with the Lutheran Church–Missouri Synod (LCMS). Its goal is to provide an "educationally rich experience in a Christ-centered environment".

History of the school includes separating from the old Lutheran High School in downtown Cleveland (due to the construction of Interstate 90 and separating into Lutheran High School West and Lutheran High School East).

Ohio High School Athletic Association state championships

 Boys' Basketball - 2005 (state championship game winner Columbus Africentric High School forfeited title), 2017, 2021, 2023
 Boys' Track and Field – 1971

Notable alumni
 Will Felder - basketball player

Notes and references

External links
 School website

High schools in Cuyahoga County, Ohio
Cleveland Heights, Ohio
Lutheran schools in Ohio
Private high schools in Ohio
Secondary schools affiliated with the Lutheran Church–Missouri Synod